Colin Clarke may refer to:
Colin Clarke (footballer, born 1946), Scottish football player and manager
Colin Clarke (footballer, born 1962), Northern Irish football player and manager
Colin Clarke (rugby league), English rugby league footballer of the 1960s and 1970s

See also
Colin Clark (disambiguation)